Chill October is an 1870 oil painting by John Everett Millais which depicts a bleak Scottish landscape in autumn. The painting measures . It was the first large-scale Scottish landscape painted by Millais.

The work was painted en plein air, near the railway line from Perth to Dundee, close to the family home of Millais' wife Effie Gray at Bowerswell House in Perth. Millais first noticed the scene when passing by train, and returned to paint it. The right foreground is dominated by long grasses, with the landscape stretching out to the left past a river bank with wind-blown willows and reeds to a distant hill beside the Firth of Tay. The scene is dominated by muted greens, yellows and browns of autumn, under a sombre grey sky.

It was exhibited at the Royal Academy in 1871, and won a prize at the Paris Exposition Universelle in 1878. It was bought in 1871 for £1,000 by Samuel Mendel for his house at Manley Hall. It was sold at auction in 1875 for 3,100 guineas (£3,255) and acquired by William Armstrong for his house, Cragside. The Magazine of Art, vol.14 in 1891 described Chill October in the Armstrong collection as "the most famous landscape in the collection ... the first and noblest of his great landscapes. It would be superfluous to describe in detail a picture which is known intimately by every British lover of art."

It was sold by Armstrong's heirs in 1910 for 4,800 guineas (£5,040), and remained in the same family for three generations until it was bought by Andrew Lloyd Webber in 1991 for £370,000.

See also
 Millais' Autumn Leaves, 1856

References
 "Poetic encounters: Millais's Chill October", Kathleen Jamie, Tate Etc., 1 September 2007
 Chill October, millais.org
 Landscape Painting and Millais's Chill October, victorianweb.org
 "Lord Armstrong's Collection of Modern Pictures. II", The Magazine of Art, Volume 14, 1891, p. 194

Paintings by John Everett Millais
1870 paintings
Landscape paintings